La Peltrie is a provincial electoral district in the Capitale-Nationale region of Quebec, Canada that elects members to the National Assembly of Quebec. It notably includes parts of Quebec City as well as the city of L'Ancienne-Lorette.

It was created for the 1981 election from a part of Chauveau electoral district.

In the change from the 2001 to the 2011 electoral map, it lost Saint-Augustin-de-Desmaures to Louis-Hébert and parts of Quebec City to Louis-Hébert and Chauveau, but gained some cities and municipalities from Chauveau and Portneuf.

Members of the National Assembly

Election results

|}

^ Change is from redistributed results. CAQ change is from ADQ.

|-
 
|Liberal
|France Hamel
|align="right"|13,025
|align="right"|37.91
|align="right"|+10.82

|}

References

External links
Information
 Elections Quebec

Election results
 Election results (National Assembly)

Maps
 2011 map (PDF)
 2001 map (Flash)
2001–2011 changes (Flash)
1992–2001 changes (Flash)
 Electoral map of Capitale-Nationale region
 Quebec electoral map, 2011

Provincial electoral districts of Quebec City
Quebec provincial electoral districts